This is a list of territorial governors in the 19th century (1801–1900), such as the administrators of colonies, protectorates, or other dependencies. Where applicable, native rulers are also listed.

A dependent territory is normally a territory that does not possess full political independence or sovereignty as a sovereign state yet remains politically outside of the controlling state's integral area. The administrators of uninhabited territories are excluded.

Denmark
Denmark–Norway, Denmark Danish colonial empire
Monarchs
Prime ministers

Danish West Indies
Governors
Wilhelm Anton Lindemann, Governor General (1799–1801)
Casimir Wilhelm von Scholten, Governor of St. Thomas, St. John (1800–1801)
John Clayton Cowell, Governor of St. Thomas, St. John (1801–1802). British occupation.
Ernst Frederik von Walterstorff, Governor General (1802)
Baltharzar Frederik Mühlenfels, Governor General (1802–1807)
Willum von Rømeling, Governor of St. Thomas, St. John (1802–1803)
Casimir Wilhelm von Scholten, Governor of St. Thomas, St. John (1803–1807)
Hans Christopher Lillienskjøld, Governor General (1807)
Henry Bowyer, Governor General (1807–1808)
Fitzroy J. Grafton McLean, Governor of St. Thomas, St. John (1807–1815). British occupation.
Peter Lotharius von Oxholm, Governor General (1815–1816)
Christian Ludvig von Holten, Governor of St. Thomas, St. John (1815–1818)
Johan Henrik von Stabel, Governor General (1816)
Adrian Benjamin Bentzon, Governor General (1816–1820)
Peter Carl Frederik von Scholten, Governor of St. Thomas, St. John (1818–1820)
Carl Adolph Rothe, Governor General (1820–1822)
Christian Ludvig von Holten, Governor of St. Thomas, St. John (1820)
Peter Carl Frederik von Scholten, Governor of St. Thomas, St. John (1820)
Carl Gottlieb Fleischer, Governor of St. Thomas, St. John (1820–1822)
Johan Frederik Bardenfleth, Governor General (1822–1827)
Carl Wilhelm Jessen, Governor of St. Thomas, St. John (1822–1823)
Peter Carl Frederik von Scholten, Governor of St. Thomas, St. John (1823–1826)
Johannes Söbötker, Governor of St. Thomas, St. John (1826–1829)
Peter Carl Frederik von Scholten, Governor General (1827–1848)
Frederik Ludvig Christian Pentz Rosenørn, Governor of St. Thomas, St. John (1829–1834)
Frederik von Oxholm, Governor of St. Thomas, St. John (1834–1836)
Johannes Söbötker, Governor of St. Thomas, St. John (1836–1848)
Frederik von Oxholm, acting Governor general (1848)
Hans Hendrik Berg, Governor of St. Thomas, St. John (1848)
Peder Hansen, Government Commissioner (1848–1851)
Frederik von Oxholm, Governor of St. Thomas, St. John (1848–1852)
Hans Ditmar Frederik Feddersen, Governor General (1851–1855)
Hans Hendrik Berg, Governor of St. Thomas, St. John (1853–1862)
Johan Frederik Schlegel, Governor General (1855–1861)
Vilhelm Ludvig Birch, Governor General (1861–1871)
John Christmas, Governor General (1871)
Frantz Ernst Bille, acting Governor general (1871–1872)
Johan August Stakeman, acting Governor general (1872)
Janus August Garde, Governor General (1872–1881)
Christian Henrik Arendrup, Governor General (1881–1893)
Carl Emil Hedemann, Governor General (1893–1903)

France
French First Republic, First French Empire, Bourbon Restoration, July Monarchy, French Second Republic, French Second Empire, French Third Republic 
Heads of state
Prime ministers

Wallis and Futuna, overseas collectivity
Administrators superior
Presidents of the Territorial assembly
Kings of Uvea (Wallis)
Amelia Tokagahahau Aliki, Queen  (1869–1895)
Isaake, King in rebellion (1895)
Vito Lavelua II, King (1895–1904)
Kings of Alo
Soane Malia Musulamu, King (c.1887–1929)
Kings of Sigave
Lutotio, King (c.1889)
Savelio Keletaona, King (late 19th century)
Mateo Tamole, King (19th/20th century)
Toviko Keletaona, King (19th/20th century)

Germany
German Empire German colonial empire

Mexico
List of heads of state of Mexico
Territorial evolution of Mexico

Alta California
List of governors of California before 1850
Capt. Luis Antonio Argüello, Governor (1822–1825)
Lt. Col. José María de Echeandía, Governor (1825–1831)
Manuel Victoria, Governor (1831–1832) 
José María de Echeandía, Governor (1831–1832) 
Pío de Jesús Pico, Governor (1832) 
José María de Echeandía, Governor (1832) In opposition, in Los Angeles 
Augustín Vicente Zamorano, provisional Governor (in the north) (1832–1833)
José María de Echeandía, Governor (in the south) (1832–1833)
José Figueroa, Governor (1833–1835)  
José Castro, acting Governor (1835–1836) 
Lieutenant Colonel Nicolás Gutiérrez, acting Governor (1836)
Colonel Mariano Chico, Governor (1836) 
Nicolás Gutiérrez, acting Governor (1836)
Gen. Juan Bautista Alvarado, self-declared "Presidente de Alta California" following a coup, Governor (1836–1837)
Carlos Antonio Carrillo, Governor (in opposition to Alvarado) (1837–1838)    
Juan Bautista Valentín Alvarado y Vallejo, Governor (1838–1842) Appointment re-confirmed by the central government.    
Brigadier General José Manuel Micheltorena, Governor (1842–1845)
Pío de Jesús Pico, Governor (1845–1846)
California declared a Mexican state (1846)
General José María Flores, Governor and Comandante General (1846–1847) In Los Angeles, in opposition to the U.S. 
Andrés Pico, acting Governor (1847–1847) In Los Angeles, in opposition to the U.S. 
U.S. occupation (1846—1847)
John Drake Sloat, military governor (1846)  
Robert Field Stockton, military governor (1846–1847)  
John Charles Frémont, military governor (1847)  
Stephen Watts Kearny, military governor (1847)  
Richard Barnes Mason, acting military governor (1847–1849)

Santa Fe de Nuevo México (1548-1848)
Facundo Melgares, acting Governor (1818–1822)
Francisco Xavier Chávez, Governor (1822–1823)
José Antonio Vizcarra, Governor (1823–1824) 
Bartolomé Baca, Governor (1823–1825)
Antonio de Narbona, Governor (1825–1827)
José Antonio Vizcarra, acting Governor (1825–1827)
Manuel Armijo, Governor (1827–1829
José Antonio Chaves, Governor (1829–1832) 
Santiago Abreú, Governor (1832–1833)
Francisco Sarracino, Governor (1833–1835)
Albino Pérez, Governor (1835–1837)
Manuel Armijo, Governor (1837–1844)
Mariano Chaves, acting Governor (1844)
Felipe Sena, acting Governor (1844)
Mariano Martínez de Lejanza, Governor (1844–1845)
José Chavéz y Castillo, Governor (1845)
Manuel Armijo, Governor (1845–1846)
Juan Bautista Vigil y Alarid, acting Governor (1846–1846)

Texas
List of Texas Governors and Presidents 
Ramón Músquiz, Governor of Coahuila and Tejas (1835)
Governors of the Texas Revolution
Henry Smith, provisional governor (1835–1836, continues in opposition)
James W. Robinson, acting provisional governor (1836)

Netherlands
Batavian Republic, Kingdom of Holland, United Kingdom of the Netherlands, Kingdom of the Netherlands Dutch colonial empire
Heads of state
Prime ministers

Asia

Dutch East Indies
Governors general
Pieter Gerardus van Overstraten, Governors general (1796–1801)
Johannes Siberg, Governors general (1801–1805)
Albertus Henricus Wiese, Governors general (1805–1808)
Herman Willem Daendels, Governors general (1808–1811)
Jan Willem Janssens, Governors general (1811)
British occupation (1811–1816)
Godert van der Capellen, Governors general (1816–1826)
Leonard du Bus de Gisignies, Governors general (1826–1830)
Johannes van den Bosch, Governors general (1830–1833)
Jean Chrétien Baud, Governors general (1833–1836)
Dominique Jacques de Eerens, Governors general (1836–1840)
Carel Sirardus Willem van Hogendorp, Governors general (1840–1841)
Pieter Merkus, Governors general (1841–1844)
Joan Cornelis Reynst, Governors general (1844–1845)
Jan Jacob Rochussen, Governors general (1845–1851)
Albertus Jacobus Duymaer van Twist, Governors general (1851–1856)
Charles Ferdinand Pahud, Governors general (1856–1861)
Ludolph Anne Jan Wilt Sloet van de Beele, Governors general (1861–1866)
Pieter Mijer (governor), Governors general (1866–1872)
James Loudon (politician), Governors general (1872–1875)
Johan Wilhelm van Lansberge, Governors general (1875–1881)
Frederik s'Jacob, Governors general (1881–1884)
Otto van Rees, Governors general (1884–1888)
Cornelis Pijnacker Hordijk, Governors general (1888–1893)
Carel Herman Aart van der Wijck, Governors general (1893–1899)
Willem Rooseboom, Governors general (1899–1904)

Oman
Al Said of Oman
Monarchs

Mombasa
Walis
Salim ibn Ahmad al-Mazru‘i, Wali (1826–1835)
Nasur ibn Ahmad al-Mazru‘i, Wali (1835–1836)
Rashid ibn Salim al-Mazru‘i, Wali (1836–1837)
Khamis ibn Rashid al-Mazru‘i, Wali (1837)
Abdallah ibn Hamish al-Mazru‘i, Wali (1837–1860)
Mubarrak ibn Rashid al-Mazru‘i, Wali (1860–1873)
Rashid ibn Hamish al-Mazru‘i, Wali (1873–1895)

Portugal
Kingdom of Portugal, United Kingdom of Portugal, Brazil and the Algarves Portuguese colonial empire
Heads of state
Prime ministers

Portuguese Cape Verde
Governors
Marcelino António Bastos, Governor (1796–1802)
António Coutinho de Lencastre, Governor (1803–1818)
António Pusich, Governor (1818–1822)
João da Matta Chapuzet, Governor (1822–1826)
Caetano Procópio Godinho de Vasconcelos, Governor (1826–1830)
Duarte da Costa e Sousa de Macedo, Governor (1830–1831)
José Coutinho de Lencastre, Governor (1831–1834)
Manuel António Martins, Governor (1834–1835)
Joaquim Pereira Marinho, Governor (1835–1836)
Domingos Correia Arouca, Governor (1836–1837)
Joaquim Pereira Marinho, Governor (1837–1839)
João de Fontes Pereira de Melo, Governor (1839–1842)
Francisco de Paula Bastos, Governor (1842–1845)
José Miguel de Noronha, Governor (1845–1847)
João de Fontes Pereira de Melo, Governor (1847–1851)
Fortunato José Barreiros, Governor (1851–1854)
António Maria Barreiros Arrobas, Governor (1854–1857)
Sebastião Lopes de Calheiros Meneses, Governor (1857–1860)
Januário Correia de Almeida, Governor (1860–1860)
Carlos Joaquim Franco, Governor (1860–1863)
José Guedes de Carvalho e Meneses, Governor (1863–1869)
Caetano Alexandre de Almeida e Albuquerque, Governor (1869–1876)
G.C. Lopes de Macedo, Governor (1877–1877)
Vasco Guedes de Carvalho e Meneses, Governor (1878–1878)
António de Nascimento Pereira de Sampaio, Governor (1879–1881)
João Paes de Vasconcellos, Governor (1882–1886)
João Cesário de Lacerda, Governor (1887–1889)
Augusto Cesário Carlos de Carvalho, Governor (1890–1890)
José Guedes Brandão de Melo, Governor  (1891–1893)
Fernando de Magalhães e Menezes, Governor  (1893–1894)
José Guedes Brandão de Melo, Governor  (1893–1896)
Alexandre Alberto da Rocha de Serpa Pinto, Governor (1897–1897)
João Cesário de Lacerda, Governor (1898–1900)

Portuguese Moçambique
Governors, Governors general
Francisco Guedes de Carvalho Meneses da Costa, Governor (1797–1801)
Isidro de Sousa e Sá, Governor (1801–1805)
Francisco de Paula de Albuquerque do Amaral Cardoso, Governor (1805–1807)
Provisional administration, (1807–1809)
António Manuel de Melo e Castro de Mendonça, Governor (1809–1812)
Marcos Caetano de Abreu e Meneses, Governor (1812–1817)
José Francisco de Paula Cavalcanti de Albuquerque, Governor (1817–1818)
Provisional administration, (1818–1819)
João da Costa M. Brito-Sanches, Governor (1819–1821)
Provisional administration, (1821–1824)
João Manuel da Silva, Governor (1824–1825)
Sebastião Xavier Botelho, Governor (1825–1829)
Paulo José Miguel de Brito, Governor (1829–1832)
Provisional administration, (1832–1834)
José Gregório Pegado, Governor (1834–1836)
Moçambique Colony/(Portuguese East Africa)
Provisional administration, (1836–1837)
António José de Melo, Governor General (1837)
João Carlos Augusto de Oeynhausen e Gravenburg, marquês de Aracaty, Governor General (1837–1838)
Juiz A. de Ramalho de Sá, President of the Governing council (1838–1840)
Joaquim Pereira Marinho, Governor General (1840–1841)
João da Costa Xavier, Governor General (1841–1843)
Rodrigo Luciano de Abreu e Lima, Governor General (1843–1847)
Domingos Fortunato de Vale, Governor General (1847–1851)
Joaquim Pinto de Magalhães, Governor General (1851–1854)
Vasco Guedes de Carvalho e Meneses, Acting Governor general (1854–1857)
João Tavares d'Almeida, Governor General (1857–1864)
Cândido M. Montes, President of the Governing council (1864)
M. António do Canto e Castro, Governor General (1864–1867)
António Augusto de Almeida Portugal Correia de Lacerda, Governor General (1867–1868)
M.N.P. de Ataíde e Azevedo, President of the Governing council (1868–1869)
António Tavares de Almeida, Governor General (1869)
Fernão da Costa Leal, Governor General (1869)
Juiz E. K. da Fonseca e Gouveia, President of the Governing council (1869–1870)
Inácio A. Alves, Acting Governor general (1870)
José Rodrigues Coelho do Amaral, Governor General (1870–1873)
Juiz J. M. Crispiniano da Fonseca, President of the Governing council (1873–1874)
José Guedes de Carvalho e Meneses, Governor General (1874–1877)
Francisco Maria da Cunha, Governor General (1877–1880)
Augusto César Rodrigues Sarmento, Acting Governor general (1880–1881)
Carlos Eugénio Correia da Silva, visconde de Paço d'Arcos, Governor General (1881–1882)
J. d'Almeida d'Avila, Acting Governor general (1882)
Agostinho Coelho, Governor General (1882–1885)
D. Henrique Real da Silva, President of the Governing council (1885)
Augusto Vidal de Castilho Barreto e Noronha, Governor General (1885–1889)
José Joaquim d'Almeida, Acting Governor general (1889)
José António de Brissac das Neves Ferreira, Governor General (1889–1890)
Joaquim José Machado, Governor General (1890–1891)
Raphael Jácome Lopes de Andrade, Governor General (1891–1893)
Francisco Teixeira da Silva, Governor General (1893–1894)
J. Correia e Lança, Acting Governor general (1894)
Fernão de Magalhães e Meneses, Governor General (1894–1895)
António José Enes -Commissioner, Governor General (1895)
J. Correia e Lança, Acting Governor general (1896)
Joaquim Mousinho de Albuquerque, Governor General (1896–1897)
Baltasar Freire Cabral, Acting Governor general (1897–1898)
Carlos Alberto Schultz Xavier, Governor General (1898)
Álvaro António Ferreira, Governor General (1898–1900)
Júlio José, marqués da Costa, Governor General (1900)
Joaquim José Machado, Governor General (1900)
Manuel Rafael Gorjão, Governor General (1900–1902)

Portuguese São Tomé and Príncipe
Governors
João Baptista de Silva, Governor (1799–1802)
Gabriel António Franco de Castro, Governor (1802–1805)
Luís Joaquim Lisboa, Governor (1805–1817)
Filipe de Freitas, Governor (1817–1824)
João Maria Xavier de Brito, Governor (1824–1830)
Joaquim Bento da Fonseca, Governor (1830–1834)
Provisional government (1834–1836)
Fernando Correia Henriques de Noronha, Acting Governor (1836–1837)
Leandro José da Costa, Governor (1837–1838)
José Joaquim de Urbanski, Governor (1838–1839)
Bernardo José de Sousa Soares de Andréa, Governor (1839–1843)
Leandro José da Costa, Governor (1843)
José Maria Marquês, Governor (1843–1846)
Chamber Senate (1846–1847)
Carlos Augusto de Morais e Almeida, Governor (1847)
Chamber Senate (1847–1848)
José Caetano René Vimont Pessoa, Governor (1848–1849)
Leandro José da Costa, Governor (1849–1851)
José Maria Marquês, Governor (1851–1853)
Francisco José da Pina Rolo, Governor (1853–1855)
Adriano Maria Passaláqua, Governor (1855–1857)
Chamber Senate (1857–1858)
Francisco António Correia, Governor (1858)
Chamber Senate (1858–1859)
Luís José Pereira e Horta, Governor (1859–1860)
José Pedro de Melo, Governor (1860–1862)
Chamber Senate (1862)
José Eduardo da Costa Moura, Governor (1862–1863)
João Baptista Brunachy, Governor (1863–1864)
Estanislau Xavier de Assunção e Almeida, Governor (1864–1865)
João Baptista Brunachy, Governor (1865–1867)
António Joaquim da Fonseca, Governor (1867)
Estanislau Xavier de Assunção e Almeida, Governor (1867–1869)
Pedro Carlos de Aguiar Craveiro Lopes, Governor (1869–1872)
João Clímaco de Carvalho, Governor (1872–1873)
Gregório José Ribeiro, Governor (1873–1876)
Estanislau Xavier de Assunção e Almeida, Governor (1876–1879)
Francisco Joaquim Ferreira do Amaral, Governor (1879)
Custódio Miguel de Borja, Acting Governor, Governor (1879–1880)
Vicente Pinheiro Lôbo Machado de Melo e Almada, Governor (1880–1881)
Augusto Maria Leão, Acting Governor (1881–1882)
Francisco Teixeira da Silva, Governor (1882)
Custódio Miguel de Borja, Governor (1884–1886)
Augusto César Rodrigues Sarmento, Governor (1886–1890)
Firmino José da Costa, Governor (1890–1891)
Francisco Eugénio Pereira de Miranda, Governor (1891–1894)
Jaime Lobo Brito Godins, Acting Governor (1894–1895)
Cipriano Leite Pereira Jardim, Governor (1895–1897)
Joaquim da Graça Correia e Lança, Governor (1897–1899)
Amâncio de Alpoim Cerqueira Borges Cabral, Governor (1899–1901)

Spain
Bourbon Spain, Kingdom of Spain, First Spanish Republic, Bourbon Restoration Spanish colonial empire
Heads of state
Prime ministers

Falkland Islands
Military Administrators of the Spanish Settlement of Puerto Soledad
Luis de Medina y Torres, governor and sea commander (1799–1800)
Francisco Javier de Viana, governor and sea commander (1800–1801)
Ramón Fernández Villegas, governor and sea commander (1801–1802)
Bernardo Bonavía, Governor and sea commander (1802–1803)
Antonio Leal de Ibarra y Oxinando, Governor and sea commander (1803–1804)
Bernardo Bonavía, Governor and sea commander (1804–1805)
Antonio Leal de Ibarra y Oxinando, Governor and sea commander (1805–1806)
Bernardo Bonavía, Governor and sea commander (1806–1809)
Gerardo Bordas, Governor and sea commander (1809–1810)
Pablo Guillén Martínez, Governor and sea commander (1810–1811)

Viceroyalty of New Granada
Viceroys
Pedro Mendinueta y Múzquiz, viceroy of New Granada (1797–1803)
Antonio José de Amar y Borbón Arguedas y Vallejo de Santacruz, viceroy (1803–1810) (1810, President of the Supreme Governing Junta) 
José Miguel Pey y García de Andrade, President of the Supreme Governing Junta (1810–1812)
Benito Pérez Brito de los Ríos Fernández Valdelomar, viceroy of New Granada (at Portobelo, Panama in refuge from Bogotá) (1812–1813)
Francisco Montalvo y Ambulodi Arriola y Casabant Valdespino, governor and captain-general (1813–1816), viceroy (1818)
Juan José de Sámano y Urribarri de Rebollar y Mazorra, viceroy (1818–1819) 
Juan de la Cruz Mourgeon y Achet, titular viceroy (1819–1821)

New Spain (complete list) –
Miguel José de Azanza, viceroy (1798-1800)
Félix Berenguer de Marquina, Viceroy (1800-1803)
José de Iturrigaray, Viceroy (1803-1808)
Pedro de Garibay, Viceroy (1808-1809)
Francisco Javier de Lizana y Beaumont, Archbishop and Viceroy (1809-1810)
Pedro Catani, President of the Audiencia (1810)
Francisco Javier Venegas, Viceroy (1810-181)
Félix María Calleja del Rey, Viceroy (1813-1816)
Juan Ruiz de Apodaca, Viceroy (1816-1821)
Francisco Novella Azabal Pérez y Sicardo, Interim Viceroy (1821)
Juan O'Donojú, Viceroy (1821)

Viceroyalty of Peru (1542–1824)
Viceroys
Ambrosio O'Higgins, 1st Marquess of Osorno, viceroy of Peru (1796–1801) 
Manuel Antonio de Arredondo y Pelegrín, President of the Audiencia and interim viceroy (1801) 
Gabriel de Avilés, 2nd Marquis of Avilés, viceroy (1801–1806)  
José Fernando Abascal y Sousa, marqués de la Concordia; viceroy (1806–1816)
Joaquín de la Pezuela, 1st Marquess of Viluma, viceroy (1816–1821)
José de la Serna, 1st Count of the Andes, acting viceroy (1821–1824)
Juan Pío de Tristán y Moscoso Carasa y Múzquiz, acting viceroy (1824–1826)

Viceroyalty of the Río de la Plata (1776–1814)
Viceroys
Gabriel de Avilés y del Fierro, marqués de Avilés, Viceroy of Rio de la Plata (1799–1801)
Joaquín del Pino y Rozas Romero y Negrete, Viceroy (1801–1804)  
Rafael de Sobremonte Núñez Castillo Angulo y Bullón Ramírez de Arellano, marqués de Sobremonte, acting viceroy (1804); viceroy (1804—1807)
William Beresford, 1st Viscount Beresford, British commander in Buenos Aires (1806–1806)
Santiago Antonio María de Liniers y Bremont (Jacques de Liniers), acting viceroy (1807–1809)
Baltazar Hidalgo de Cisneros de la Torre, viceroy (1809–1810)
Francisco Javier de Elío, nominal viceroy (1810–1816)
Presidents of the Provisional Governing Council of the Provinces of the Río de la Plata, in the name of Fernando VII
the Municipal Council of Buenos Aires, (1810) 
Baltazar Hidalgo de Cisneros de la Torre, (1810) 
Cornelio Judas Tadeo de Saavedra, (1810–1811)
Feliciano Antonio Chiclana y Giménez de Paz, President of the Executive Government of the Provinces of the Río de la Plata (1811) 
Presidents of the Superior Provisional Government of the United Provinces of Río de la Plata, in the name of Fernando VII
Feliciano Antonio Chiclana y Giménez de Paz, (1811–1812) 
Manuel Mariano de Sarratea Altolaguirre, (1812)
Juan Martín Mariano de Pueyrredón y O'Dogan (1812)

United Kingdom
United Kingdom of Great Britain and Ireland British colonial empire
Monarchs
Prime ministers

British Isles

Guernsey, Crown dependency
British monarchs are the Dukes of Normandy
Governors
Charles Grey, Governor (1797–1807)
George Herbert, Governor (1807–1827)
William Keppel, Governor (1827–1834)
Lieutenant governors

Bailiffs
Robert Porrett Le Marchant, Bailiff (1800–1810)
Peter De Havilland, Bailiff (1810–1821)
Daniel De Lisle Brock, Bailiff (1821–1843)
Jean Guille, Bailiff (1843–1845)
Peter Stafford Carey, Bailiff (1845–1883)
John de Havilland Utermarck, Bailiff (1883–1884)
Edgar McCulloch, Bailiff (1884–1895)
Thomas Godfrey Carey, Bailiff (1895–1902)

Ireland, part of the United Kingdom of Great Britain and Ireland but in many ways still a client state or colony
Lords Lieutenant
Charles Cornwallis, Lord Lieutenant (1798–1801)
Philip Yorke, Lord Lieutenant (1801–1805)
Edward Clive, Lord Lieutenant (1805–1806)
John Russell, Lord Lieutenant (1806–1807)
Charles Lennox, Lord Lieutenant (1807–1813)
Charles Whitworth, Lord Lieutenant (1813–1817)
Charles Chetwynd-Talbot, Lord Lieutenant (1817–1821)
Richard Wellesley, Lord Lieutenant (1821–1828)
Henry Paget, Lord Lieutenant (1828–1829)
Hugh Percy, Lord Lieutenant (1829–1830)
Henry Paget, Lord Lieutenant (1830–1833)
Richard Wellesley, Lord Lieutenant (1833–1835)
Thomas Hamilton, Lord Lieutenant (1835–1835)
Constantine Phipps, Lord Lieutenant (1835–1839)
Hugh Fortescue, Lord Lieutenant (1839–1841)
Thomas de Grey, Lord Lieutenant (1841–1844)
William à Court, Lord Lieutenant (1844–1846)
John Ponsonby, Lord Lieutenant (1846–1847)
George Villiers, Lord Lieutenant (1847–1852)
Archibald Montgomerie, Lord Lieutenant (1852–1853)
Edward Eliot, Lord Lieutenant (1853–1855)
George Howard, Lord Lieutenant (1855–1858)
Archibald Montgomerie, Lord Lieutenant (1858–1859)
George Howard, Lord Lieutenant (1859–1864)
John Wodehouse, Lord Lieutenant (1864–1866)
James Hamilton, Lord Lieutenant (1866–1868)
John Spencer, Lord Lieutenant (1868–1874)
James Hamilton, Lord Lieutenant (1874–1876)
John Spencer-Churchill, Lord Lieutenant (1876–1880)
Francis Cowper, Lord Lieutenant (1880–1882)
John Spencer, Lord Lieutenant (1882–1885)
Henry Herbert, Lord Lieutenant (1885–1886)
John Hamilton-Gordon, Lord Lieutenant (1886–1886)
Charles Vane-Tempest-Stewart, Lord Lieutenant (1886–1889)
Lawrence Dundas, Lord Lieutenant (1889–1892)
Robert Crewe-Milnes, Lord Lieutenant (1892–1895)
George Cadogan, Lord Lieutenant (1895–1902)

Isle of Man, Crown dependency
Lieutenant Governors
John Murray, Governor-in-chief, Captain General (1793–1804)
Henry Murray, Lieutenant Governor (1804–1805)
Cornelius Smelt, Lieutenant Governor (1805–1832)
John Ready, Lieutenant Governor (1832–1837)
John Ready, Lieutenant Governor (1837–1845)
Charles Hope, Lieutenant Governor (1845–1860)
Mark Quayle, Clerk of the RollsLieutenant Governor (1860–1860)
Francis Pigott Stainsby Conant, Lieutenant Governor (1860–1863)
Mark Quayle, Clerk of the RollsLieutenant Governor (1863–1863)
Henry Loch, Lieutenant Governor (1863–1882)
Spencer Walpole, Lieutenant Governor (1882–1893)
Joseph West Ridgeway, Lieutenant Governor (1893–1895)
John Henniker-Major, Deputy Governor (1895–1902)

Jersey, Crown dependency
Governors
George Townshend, Governor (1796–1807)
John Pitt, Governor (1807–1820)
William Beresford, Governor (1820–1854)
Lieutenant Governors
Andrew Gordon, Lieutenant Governor (1797–1806)
George Don, Lieutenant Governor (1806–1814)
Tomkyns Hilgrove Turner, Lieutenant Governor (1814–1816)
Hugh Mackay Gordon, Lieutenant Governor (1816–1821)
Colin Halkett, Lieutenant Governor (1821–1830)
William Thornton, Lieutenant Governor (1830–1835)
Archibald Campbell, Lieutenant Governor (1835–1838)
Edward Gibbs, Lieutenant Governor (1838–1847)
James Henry Reynett, Lieutenant Governor (1847–1852)
Frederick Love, Lieutenant Governor (1852–1857)
Godfrey Charles Mundy, Lieutenant Governor (1857–1860)
Robert Percy Douglas, Lieutenant Governor (1860–1862)
B. Loch, acting Lieutenant Governor (1862–1863)
Burke Cuppage, Lieutenant Governor (1863–1868)
Philip Melmoth Nelson Guy, Lieutenant Governor (1868–1873)
William Norcott, Lieutenant Governor (1873–1878)
Lothian Nicholson, Lieutenant Governor (1878–1883)
Henry Wray, Lieutenant Governor (1883–1887)
Charles Brisbane Ewart, Lieutenant Governor (1887–1892)
Edwin Markham, Lieutenant Governor (1892–1895)
Edward Hopton, Lieutenant Governor (1895–1900)
Henry Richard Abadie, Lieutenant Governor (1900–1904)

Caribbean

Anguilla, overseas territory
Governors
Chief ministers

Colony of the Bahamas
Governors
William Dowdeswell, Governor (1797–1801)
John Halkett, Governor (1801–1804)
Charles Cameron, Governor (1804–1820)
Lewis Grant, Governor (1821–1829)
James Carmichael Smyth, Governor (1829–1833)
Blayney Townley Balfour, Governor (1833–1835)
William MacBean George Colebrooke, Governor (1835–1837)
Francis Cockburn, Governor (1837–1844)
George Benvenuto Matthew, Governor (1844–1849)
John Gregory, Governor (1849–1854)
Alexander Bannerman, Governor (1854–1857)
Charles John Bayley, Governor (1857–1864)
Rawson William Rawson, Governor (1864–1869)
James Walker, Governor (1869–1871)
George Cumine Strahan, Governor (1871–1873)
John Pope Hennessy, Governor (1873–1874)
William Robinson, Governor (1874–1880)
Jeremiah Thomas Fitzgerald Callaghan, Governor (1880–1881)
Charles Cameron Lees, Governor (1882–1884)
Henry Arthur Blake, Governor (1884–1887)
Ambrose Shea, Governor (1887–1895)
William Frederick Haynes Smith, Governor (1895–1898)
Gilbert Thomas Carter, Governor (1898–1904)

Colony of Barbados
Governors of Barbados and the Windward Islands
William Bishop, Acting Governor (1800–1801)
Francis Mackenzie, Governor (1802–1806)
John Spooner, Acting Governor (1806–1810)
George Beckwith, Governor (1810–1815)
James Leith, Governor (1815–1816)
John Foster Alleyne, Acting Governor (1817)
Stapleton Cotton, Governor (1817–1820)
John Brathwaite Skeete, Acting Governor (1820)
Samuel Hinds, Acting Governor (1821)
Henry Warde, Governor (1821–1829)
James Lyon, Governor (1829–1833)
Governorship and colony combined with that of British Windward Islands (1833–1885)
Charles Cameron Lees, Governor (1885–1889)
Walter Joseph Sendall, Governor (1889–1891)
James Shaw Hay, Governor (1891–1900)
Frederick Mitchell Hodgson, Governor (1900–1904)

Barbados and the British Windward Islands
Governors
Lionel Smith, Governor (1833–1836)
Evan John Murray MacGregor, Governor (1836–1841)
Charles Henry Darling, Governor (1841)
Charles Edward Grey, Governor (1841–1846)
William Reid, Governor (1846–1848)
William MacBean George Colebrooke, Governor (1848–1856)
Francis Hincks, Governor (1856–1862)
James Walker, Governor (1862–1868)
Rawson William Rawson, Governor (1868–1875)
Sanford Freeling, Acting Governor (1875)
John Pope Hennessy, Governor (1875–1876)
George Cumine Strahan, Governor (1876–1880)
D. J. Gamble, Acting Governor (1880)
William Robinson, Governor (1880–1885)

Cayman Islands, overseas territory
Chief magistrates
William Bodden, Chief magistrate (1776–1823)
James Coe the Elder, Chief magistrate (1823–1829)
John Drayton, Chief magistrate (1829–1842)
James Coe the Younger, Chief magistrate (1842–1855)
William Eden, Chief magistrate (1855–1879)
William Bodden Webster, Chief magistrate (1879–1888)
Edmund Parsons, Chief magistrate (1888–1898)
Frederick Shedden Sanguinnetti, Commissioner (1898–1907)

Colony of Jamaica
Governors
George Nugent, Governor (1801–1805)
Eyre Coote, Governor (1806–1808)
William Montagu, Governor (1808–1821)
John Keane, Acting Governor (1827–1829)
Somerset Lowry-Corry, Governor (1829–1832)
George Cuthbert, Acting Governor (1832)
Constantine Phipps, Governor (1832–1834)
Amos Norcott, Acting Governor (1834)
George Cuthbert, Acting Governor (1834)
Howe Peter Browne, Governor (1834–1836)
Lionel Smith, Governor (1836–1839)
Charles Theophilus Metcalfe, Governor (1839–1842)
James Bruce, Governor (1842–1846)
George Henry Frederick Berkeley, Acting Governor (1846–1847)
Charles Edward Grey, Governor (1847–1853)
Henry Barkly, Governor (1853–1856)
Edward Wells Bell, Acting Governor (1856–1857)
Charles Henry Darling, Governor (1857–1862)
Edward John Eyre, Acting Governor (1862–1864), Governor (1864–1865)
Henry Knight Storks, Governor (1865–1866)
John Peter Grant, Governor (1866–1874)
W. A. G. Young, Acting Governor (1874)
William Grey, Governor (1874–1877)
Edward Everard Rushworth Mann, Acting Governor (1877)
Anthony Musgrave, Governor (1877–1883)
Somerset M. Wiseman Clarke, Acting Governor (1883)
Dominic Jacotin Gamble, Acting Governor (1883)
Henry Wylie Norman, Governor (1883–1889)
William Clive Justice, Acting Governor (1889)
Henry Arthur Blake, Governor (1889–1898)
Henry Jardine Hallowes, Acting Governor (1898)
Augustus William Lawson Hemming, Governor (1898–1904)

Turks and Caicos Islands, overseas territory
Commissioners
Daniel Thomas Smith, Commissioner (1874–1878)
Edward Noel Walker, Commissioner (1878)
Robert Baxter Llewelyn, Commissioner (1878–1883)
Frederick Shedden Sanguinetti, Commissioner (1883–1885)
Henry Moore Jackson, Commissioner (1885–1888)
Alexis Wynns Harriott, Commissioner (1888–1891)
Henry Huggins, Commissioner (1891–1893)
Edward John Cameron, Commissioner (1893–1899)
Geoffrey Peter St. Aubyn, Commissioner (1899–1901)

British Virgin Islands, overseas territory
Administrators
Edward John Cameron, Administrator (1887–1894)
Alexander R. Mackay, Administrator (1894–1896)
Nathaniel George Cookman, Administrator (1896–1903)

British Windward Islands
See also "Barbados and the British Windward Islands" above.
Governors

Mediterranean

Gibraltar
Governors
Charles O'Hara, Governor (1795–1802)
Charles Barnett, Governor (1802)
Prince Edward, Governor (1802–1820)
Thomas Trigge, Acting Governor (1803–1804)
Henry Edward Fox, Acting Governor (1804–1806)
James Drummond, Acting Governor (1806)
Hew Dalrymple, Acting Governor (1806–1808)
James Drummond, Acting Governor (1808–1809)
John Cradock, Acting Governor (1809)
John Smith, Acting Governor (1809)
Alex McKenzie Fraser, Acting Governor (1809)
Colin Campbell, Acting Governor (1809–1814)
George Don, Acting Governor (1814–1821)
John Pitt, Governor (1820–1835)
George Don, Acting Governor (1825–1831)
William Houston, Acting Governor (1831–1835)
Alexander George Woodford, Governor (1835–1842)
Robert Wilson, Governor (1842–1848)
Robert Gardiner, Governor (1848–1855)
James Fergusson, Governor (1855–1859)
William Codrington, Governor (1859–1865)
Richard Airey, Governor (1865–1870)
William Williams, Governor (1870–1876)
Robert Napier, Governor (1876–1883)
John Miller Adye, Governor (1883–1886)
Arthur Edward Hardinge, Governor (1886–1890)
Leicester Smyth, Governor (1890–1891)
H. R. L. Newdigate, Acting Governor (1891)
Lothian Nicholson, Governor (1891–1893)
G. J. Smart, Acting Governor (1893)
Robert Biddulph, Governor (1893–1900)
George White, Governor (1900–1905)

North America

Newfoundland Colony
Commodore Governors, Governors
Charles Pole, Commodore Governor (1800–1801)
James Gambier, Commodore Governor (1802–1803)
Erasmus Gower, Commodore Governor (1804–1806)
John Holloway, Commodore Governor (1807–1809)
John Thomas Duckworth, Commodore Governor (1810–1812)
Richard Goodwin Keats, Commodore Governor (1813–1816)
Francis Pickmore, Commodore Governor (1817–1818)
Charles Hamilton, Commodore Governor (1818–1825)
Thomas John Cochrane, Governor (1825–1834)
Henry Prescott, Governor (1834–1841)
John Harvey, Governor (1841–1846)
Robert Law (colonial administrator), Governor (1846–1847)
John Le Marchant, Governor (1847–1852)
Ker Baillie-Hamilton, Governor (1852–1855)
Charles Henry Darling, Governor (1855–1857)
Alexander Bannerman, Governor (1857–1864)
Anthony Musgrave, Governor (1864–1869)
Stephen John Hill, Governor (1869–1876)
John Hawley Glover, Governor (1876–1881)
Henry Berkeley Fitzhardinge Maxse, Governor (1881–1883)
John Hawley Glover, Governor (1883–1885)
William Des Vœux, Governor (1886–1887)
Henry Arthur Blake, Governor (1887–1889)
John Terence Nicholls O'Brien, Governor (1889–1895)
Herbert Harley Murray, Governor (1895–1898)
Henry Edward McCallum, Governor (1898–1901)

Oceania

Bermuda, overseas territory
Governors
George Beckwith, Governor (1798–1803)
Henry Tucker, Governor (1803–1805)
Francis Gore, Lieutenant governor (1805–1806)
Henry Tucker, Governor (1806)
John Hodgson, Governor (1806–1810)
Samuel Trott, Governor (1810–1811)
James Cockburn, Governor (1811–1812)
William Smith, Governor (1812)
George Horsford, Lieutenant governor (1812–1816)
James Cockburn, Governor (1814–1816)
William Smith, Governor (1816–1817)
James Cockburn, Governor (1817–1819)
William Smith, Governor (1819)
William Lumley, Governor (1819–1822)
William Smith, Governor (1822–1823)
William Lumley, Governor (1823–1825)
William Smith, Governor (1825–1826)
Hilgrove Turner, Governor (1826–1829)
Robert Kennedy, Acting Governor (1829)
Hilgrove Turner, Governor (1829–1830)
Robert Kennedy, Acting Governor (1830)
Hilgrove Turner, Governor (1830–1832)
Stephen Chapman, Governor (1832–1835)
Henry G. Hunt, Acting Governor (1835)
Robert Kennedy, Governor (1835–1836)
Stephen Chapman, Governor (1836–1839)
William Reid, Governor (1839–1846)
William N. Hutchinson, Acting Governor (1846)
Charles Elliot, Governor (1846–1852)
W. Hassell Eden, Acting Governor (1852–1853)
George Philpots, Acting Governor (1853)
Soulden Oakley, Acting Governor (1853)
Thomas C. Robe, Acting Governor (1853)
Soulden Oakley, Acting Governor (1853)
Charles Elliot, Governor (1853–1854)
Montgomery Williams, Acting Governor (1854)
Freeman Murray, Governor (1854–1859)
AT. Heniphill, Acting Governor (1859)
William Munroe, Governor (1859–1860)
Freeman Murray, Governor (1860–1861)
Harry Ord, Governor (1861–1864)
William Munroe, Acting Governor (1864)
W.H. Hamley, Lieutenant governor (1864–1865)
Harry St. George Ord, Governor (1865–1866)
W.H. Hamley, Lieutenant governor (1866–1867)
Arnold Thompson, Acting Governor (1867)
Frederick Chapman, Governor (1867–1870)
W. F. Brett, Lieutenant governor (1870)
John Henry Lefroy, Governor (1871–1877)
Robert Michael Laffan, Governor (1877–1882)
Thomas L. J. Gallwey, Governor (1882–1888)
Edward Newdegate, Governor (1888–1891)
Thomas Lyons, Governor (1892–1896)
George Digby Barker, Governor (1896–1901)

Falkland Islands
Commanders, Administrators, Governors
Luis Vernet, Commander (1829–1831)
Esteban Mestivier, Commander (1832)
Henry Smith, Administrator (1833–1838)
Robert Lowcay, Administrator (1838–1839)
Robinson, Administrator (1839)
John Tyssen, Administrator (1839–1841)
Richard Clement Moody, Lieutenant Governor (1841–1843), Governor (1843–1848)
George Rennie, Governor (1848–1855)
Thomas Edward Laws Moore, Governor (1855–1862)
James George Mackenzie, Governor (1862–1866)
William Cleaver Francis Robinson, Governor (1866–1870)
George Abbas Kooli D'Arcy, Governor (1870–1876)
Jeremiah Thomas Fitzgerald Callaghan, Governor (1876–1880)
Thomas Kerr, Governor (1880–1886)
Arthur Cecil Stuart Barkly, Governor (1886–1887)
Thomas Kerr, Governor (1887–1891)
Roger Tuckfield Goldsworthy, Governor (1891–1897)
William Grey-Wilson, Governor (1897–1904)

Pitcairn Islands
Magistrates
John Adams, Leader (1800–1829)
Joshua Hill, President (1832–1838)Became a British colony in 1838Edward Quintal, Magistrate (1838–1839)
Arthur Quintal I, Magistrate (1840–1841)
Fletcher Christian II, Magistrate (1842)
Matthew McCoy, Magistrate (1843)
Thursday October Christian II, Magistrate (1844)
Arthur Quintal II, Magistrate (1845–1846)
Charles Christian II, Magistrate (1847)
George Adams, Magistrate (1848)
Simon Young, Magistrate (1849)
Arthur Quintal II, Magistrate (1850)
Thursday October Christian II, Magistrate (1851)
Abraham Blatchly Quintal, Magistrate (1852)
Matthew McCoy, Magistrate (1853)
Arthur Quintal II, Magistrate (1854)
George Martin Frederick Young, Magistrate (1855–1856)
Thursday October Christian II, Magistrate (1864)
Moses Young, Magistrate (1865–1866)
Thursday October Christian II, Magistrate (1867)
Robert Pitcairn Buffett, Magistrate (1868)
Moses Young, Magistrate (1869)
James Russell McCoy, Magistrate (1870–1872)
Thursday October Christian II, Magistrate (1873–1874)
Moses Young, Magistrate (1875)
Thursday October Christian II, Magistrate (1876–1877)
James Russell McCoy, Magistrate (1878–1879)
Thursday October Christian II, Magistrate (1880)
Moses Young, Magistrate (1881)
Thursday October Christian II, Magistrate (1882)
James Russell McCoy, Magistrate (1883)
Benjamin Stanley Young, Magistrate (1884–1885)
James Russell McCoy, Magistrate (1886–1889)
Charles Carleton Vieder Young, Magistrate (1890–1891)
Benjamin Stanley Young, Magistrate (1892)
James Russell McCoy, President of the Council (1893–1896)
William Alfred Young, President of the Council (1897)
James Russell McCoy, President of the Council (1897–1904)

United States
Territorial evolution of the United States
List of states and territories of the United States

United States overseas territories
Caribbean Sea
Puerto Rico Unincorporated territory of the United States Ceded to the U.S. in 1898.
Governors
Manuel Macías y Casado, Spanish Governor-general (1898)
Ricardo de Ortega y Diez, acting  governor-general (1898)
Ángel Rivero Méndez, acting governor-general (1898)
Nelson Appleton Miles, Commanding General (1898)
John R. Brooke, military governor (1898)
Guy Vernor Henry, military governor (1899)
George Whitefield Davis, military governor (1899–1900)
Governors (1900–1949)
Charles Herbert Allen, Governor (1900–1901)

Cuba: Spain ceded authority to the U.S. in 1899 (de jure from 1899).
President of the Assembly of Representatives of the Cuban Revolution
Domingo Méndez Capote, (1898)
Presidents of the Executive Council of the Assembly of Representatives of the Cuban Revolution
General Rafael María Portuondo Tomayo, (1898–1899)
General of Division José Lacret y Morlot, (1899)
Governors
Adolfo Jiménez Castellanos, Spanish Governor-general (1898–1899)
John Rutter Brooke, American Governor-General (1899)
Leonard Wood, American Governor-General (1899–1902)

Pacific Ocean
Territory of Hawaii Annexed by the U.S. in 1898. Organized as territory (1900—1959). Statehood in 1959.
List of governors of Hawaii
Sanford B. Dole, Governor (1900–1903)

American Samoa, unincorporated territory of the United States since the Tripartite Convention of December 2, 1899.
Governors
Benjamin Franklin Tilley, Commandant (1900–1901)

Guam was captured by U.S. Navy 1898. Ceded to the U.S. by the Treaty of Paris of 1898, 1899. Transferred to the United States Navy control in 1898. 
American capture of the territory (1898-present)
Henry Glass, U.S. Naval commander, acting Commissioner (21 June 1898 — 23 June 1898)
Francisco Martínez Portusach, acting Commissioner (1898)
Governors (1898–1899)
José Sixto (Sisto) y Rodríguez, 3rd acting Commissioner (1898) overthrew PortusachVenancio Roberto, 4th acting Commissioner (1898) overthrew SistoJosé Sisto, acting Commissioner (1899) reinstated by U.S. NavyEdward David Taussig, acting Naval governor (1898)
Joaquín Pérez y Cruz, acting Governor (1899) local councilWilliam P. Coe, acting Governor (1899) local councilCaptain (USN) Louis A. Kaiser, acting Governor (1899–1899) local councilAmerican Naval governors (1899–1941)
Richard Phillips Leary, Naval governor of Guam (1899–1900)
William Edwin Safford, acting for Leary (1899–1900)
Seaton Schroeder, Naval governor of Guam (1900–1901)

Philippines  Proclamation of independence (insurrection against Spain and then the U.S.; 12 1898–13 1902).  The U.S. occupies Manila (14 1898). Treaty of Paris (1898) ceding the Philippines by Spain to the U.S., proclaimed Philippine Islands'' (11 1899). U.S territory (14 1898–3 1942)
United States Military Government (1898–1901): Governors-General
Wesley Merritt, U.S. Governor-General (1898)
Elwell Stephen Otis,  U.S. Governor-General (1898–1900)
Arthur MacArthur Jr., U.S. Governor-General (1900–1901)

Notes

References

External links
WorldStatesmen—an online encyclopedia of the leaders of nations and territories

Territorial governors
-19th century
Territorial governors
 Territorial governors